Argentina is subdivided into twenty-three provinces, each of it counting with its own governor. The country is organized under a federal system, so each province has its own constitution, and the powers and regulations of each governor vary.

Buenos Aires is not a province, nor is it part of  Buenos Aires Province. The 1994 amendment of the Constitution of Argentina made it an autonomous city, with its own constitution, ruled by an elected mayor (Buenos Aires City Chief of Government).

A governor may be removed by the national government in the case of great turmoil, or if the legitimate governor had been illegally removed, for example, by a coup d'état. The President of Argentina would ask in this case for the Federal intervention of the province, which must be approved by the National Congress of Argentina.

Gallery

List of current provincial heads of government

See also
 List of female provincial governors in Argentina
 List of provincial legislatures in Argentina

 
Argentina
 |Governors